Monolith is the third studio album by the British crust punk band Amebix, released in 1987 by Heavy Metal Records. Shortly after its release, Amebix disbanded, and Monolith would be their final studio album until they reunited in 2008 and released Sonic Mass in 2011.

The album was re-released in 2008 as a sliding-scale download by Moshpit Tragedy Records. The album was remastered and re-released again in 2016 on Easy Action Records.

Track listing

Critical reception 

While significantly less positive than its predecessor Arise!, Monolith was generally appreciated by Punknews. It was mainly metal-oriented, with aspects of anarcho-punk. The review stated that no particular song was worthy of note, but that the album was generally worthwhile.

Personnel 
Amebix
 The Baron Rockin von Aphid (Rob Miller) — bass, vocals
 Stig da Pig (Chris Miller) — guitar, backing vocals
 Spider (Robert Richards) — drums
 A. Droid (Andy Wiggins) — keyboards

Additional personnel
 Cath — flute on "Monolith"
 ARj — backing vocals on "Coming Home"

References

External links 
 Amebix official website

1987 albums
Amebix albums